The Lotus Excel (Type 89) is a sports car designed and built by British automobile manufacturer Lotus Cars from 1982 to 1992. It is based on the design of the earlier Lotus Eclat, which itself was based on the earlier Lotus Type 75 Elite.

Development

Toyota engaged Lotus to assist with the engineering work on the Supra. During this period, Toyota became a major shareholder in Lotus, later giving up their holding when General Motors bought Lotus.

Part of the deal between Lotus and Toyota included the use of many Toyota mechanical components in Lotus' cars. The original Excel (aka the Eclat Excel) used the W58 manual transmission, driveshafts, rear differential, 14x7 inch alloy wheels, and door handles from the A60 Supra. The engine was the familiar all-aluminium, DOHC 2.2 L Lotus 912 slant-four engine also used in the Lotus Esprit S3.

Overview 
Launched in October 1982, the Excel received two major upgrades during its 10-year production run. With the introduction of the Excel SE in October 1985, the bumpers, wing and interior were changed, including a new dashboard. In October 1986 the Excel SA with an automatic gearbox was introduced. Further facelifts in 1989 saw Citroën CX-derived mirrors, as also featured on the Esprit, and 15 inch OZ alloy wheels to a similar pattern as the Esprit's.

The body was made from vacuum injected resin and was made in upper and lower halves which were joined together, evident from a piece of black trim around the car. The body was mounted onto a galvanised steel backbone chassis. This manufacturing process gave the car a good level of structural rigidity. The suspension system consisted of a single transverse lower arm coupled with an anti-roll bar and a wishbone above the lower arm at the front while at the rear the wishbone was mounted below the transverse links. Coil springs and dampers were used throughout.

The Excel is also known for its cornering and handling due to 50:50 weight distribution.

The Excel was never formally imported or made available in the USA, but one was imported for evaluation in 1987. According to the importer "In early 1987 we imported one Excel (an SE, LHD, white with a blue half leather interior), on a carnet for evaluation and public review. It was returned to LCL, Hethel 6 months later as required by the carnet and US regulations."

The decision not to release the model in the USA was due to that country's stringent emission regulations (which would hinder the car's performance), and poor sales of the car in Europe.

By 1991, Lotus was planning to replace the Excel with a coupé version of the Elan roadster, but these plans were shelved as a result of falling sales which saw the whole Elan project cancelled and no direct replacement for the Excel when it was discontinued in 1992.

415 are still registered in the United Kingdom as of 2011, but 240 of them are SORN (Statutory Off Road Notification).

In 2012, the BBC program Top Gear produced a special called "50 Years of Bond Cars", hosted by presenter Richard Hammond. As part of the program, Hammond attempts to recreate the Lotus Esprit submarine sports car from the movie The Spy Who Loved Me. For budgetary reasons, the car used was an Excel, rather than an Esprit. Surprisingly, the results appeared to be successful.

Model Year changes

1984
From 1984 the Eclat Excel was referred to as the Excel. Body-coloured bumpers were introduced. It also received a louvered bonnet, a boot spoiler, and new eight-spoke alloy wheels became an option. The Lotus badge was all black background to mark the death of founder Colin Chapman.

1985
The front wheel arch profile was flared, but it became no wider overall. The boot opening was made larger, while front fog lamps and a VDO instrument cluster were installed. 15-inch wheels became an option.

1986

In October 1985, for the 1986 model year, the S.E. option arrived, coupled with the more powerful H.C. (High Compression) engine. Other changes included a higher compression ratio of 10.9:1, higher lift inlet cams and larger portion to inlet and exhaust valves. The fascia and switchgears were modified on all Excel models, along with an upgraded air conditioning system (an extra-cost option) and a standard adjustable steering column. The standard Excel remained available alongside the pricier S.E.

1987
For 1987 the S.A. automatic model was made available, equipped with a ZF four-speed unit. With a focus on comfort, it also offered cruise control and central door locking.

1988
In 1988 the Excel received a number of under-the-shell improvements, including a lighter, cross-drilled crankshaft, new engine mounting legs and bell housing, altered rear body mounts, a boot floor brace and revised body shell undertray, and a revised fuel system. In terms of appearance, the 1988 Excel looked mostly as it had done since 1984.

1989

In 1989 the Excel was given another makeover, with a restyled bonnet, new front and rear spoilers, updated wheels and interior trim. The wing mirrors were changed to the aerodynamic ones from the Citroën CX. The engine received an air intake temperature control system for increased longevity. The Excel continued to be built in small numbers until the plug was pulled in 1992.

Hethel 25th Anniversary Celebration edition
Only forty of the "Hethel 25th Anniversary Celebration edition" were produced, 35 in Celebration Green Metallic and 5 in Calypso Red. This special edition received a Clarion CDC 9300 head unit, a remote control stacking CD player and upgraded speakers, red instrument lighting, air conditioning, a full tan leather interior with perforated leather panels and tan leather-clad steering wheel. The floors were carpeted in 100 percent Wilton wool. The car's technical specifications were as for the standard Excel.

Models produced
 Excel     1982–1992
 Excel S.E.  1985–1992
 Excel S.A.  1986–1992

References

External links

 Lotus Excel Register/Owners Club 
 Lotus Excel info. and maintenance site 

Excel
Rear-wheel-drive vehicles
Sports cars
Coupés
1990s cars
Cars introduced in 1982
Cars discontinued in 1992